The 2017 Big Ten Conference men's soccer tournament was the 27th edition of the tournament. It determined the Big Ten Conference's automatic berth into the 2017 NCAA Division I Men's Soccer Championship. Maryland entered the tournament as the three-time defending champions, but were defeated in the quarterfinals by eventual champions Wisconsin.  

This was the second Big Ten Tournament title for the Wisconsin Badgers. The Badgers defeated Indiana in penalty kicks in the championship game.

Seeds
All nine Big Ten schools participated in the tournament. Teams were seeded by conference record, with a tiebreaker system used to seed teams with identical conference records. The top 10 teams received a first round bye and the top four teams received a double bye. Tiebreaking procedures remained unchanged from the 2016 Tournament.

Bracket

Results

First round

Quarterfinals

Semifinals

Final

Top goalscorers

All-Tournament team 

 Tommy Katsiyiannis, Northwestern 
 Sebastian Elney, Maryland 
 Josh Levine, Penn State 
 John Freitag, Michigan State 
 Ivo Cerda, Michigan 
 Abdi Mohamed, Ohio State 
 Francesco Moore, Indiana 
 Grant Lillard, Indiana 
 Phillipp Schilling, Wisconsin 
 Alex Masbruch, Wisconsin 
 Tom Barlow, Wisconsin

 Offensive Player of the Tournament: Tom Barlow, Wisconsin 
 Defensive Player of the Tournament: Phillipp Schilling, Wisconsin

See also 
 Big Ten Conference Men's Soccer Tournament
 2017 Big Ten Conference men's soccer season
 2017 NCAA Division I Men's Soccer Championship
 2017 NCAA Division I men's soccer season

References

External links 
Big Ten Men's Soccer Tournament Central

Big Ten Men's Soccer Tournament
Big Ten Conference Men's Soccer Tournament
Big Ten Men's Soccer Tournament